Jiang Feng (29 July 1929 – 17 October 2017) was a Chinese literary translator and author who won the Lu Xun Literary Prize (1997), a literary award in China.

He is among the first few in China who translated the works of Percy Bysshe Shelley's into Chinese language.

Biography
Jiang was born Wu Yunsen in Shanghai in July 1929, with his ancestral home in Xi County, Anhui.

Jiang secondary studied at the Southwest United University Attached High School, he graduated from Peking University and Tsinghua University.

In 1946, Jiang served as the chief editor of Chenxing and started to publish works.

Jiang joined the People's Liberation Army in 1949.

After the founding of the Communist State, Jiang was appointed a Standing Committee member of the Jiangxi Literature Association.

Jiang served as an associate editor of Honglou in 1956.

In 1962, Jiang was transferred to Beijing Edition and Translation Association.

After the Cultural Revolution, Jiang founded Cuncao and he served as the chief editor.

Jiang was transferred to Chinese Academy of Social Sciences in 1980 and he joined the China Writers Association in 1983.

In 1996, Jiang became a professor at Tsinghua University.

Works
 Walking in the Frontier Fortress
 The Death of the Carter

Translations
 The Complete Works of Shelley (Percy Bysshe Shelley)
 Poetry of Shelley (Percy Bysshe Shelley)
 Poetry of Dickinson (Emily Dickinson)
 Contemporary American Poetry

Awards
 Writing Award (1952)
 Scholastic Award (1954)
 Lu Xun Literary Prize (1997)
 Chinese Translation Association - Lifetime Achievement Award (2012)

References

1929 births
2017 deaths
Poets from Shanghai
People's Republic of China translators
English–Chinese translators
National University of Peking alumni
Tsinghua University alumni
Republic of China journalists
People's Republic of China journalists
People's Republic of China poets
Chinese dramatists and playwrights
20th-century Chinese translators
21st-century Chinese translators